Operating systems OS 10 or operating system 10 or variation, may refer to:

Apple
 Mac OS X, the Apple Macintosh operating system succeeding Classic Mac OS
 Mac OS X 10.0, the initial release of Mac OS X in 2001, succeeding Mac OS System 9
 OS X Yosemite (OS X 10.10), the 11th major version of Mac OS X in 2014
 iOS 10, the 10th major version of iPod and iPhone OS in 2016
 tvOS 10, the 7th major version of the AppleTV OS in 2016, tvOS being a variant of iOS

Other uses
 Version 10 Unix, released in 1989, the last version of the original Unix of Bell Labs
 Android 10, Google Android OS 10 released in 2019
 BlackBerry 10 (BBX, BB10), BlackBerry OS 10.0 based on QNX succeeding the preceding BlackBerry OS 7.1
 SmartFabric OS10, the networking hardware management OS by Dell EMC
 TOPS-10, the Digital Equipment Corporation operating system
 Windows 10, the Microsoft Windows major release (v 10.0) succeeding Windows 8 (v 6.4)
 Windows 10 Mobile, the Microsoft Windows OS (v 10.0) for mobile devices succeeding Windows Phone 8.1

See also

 System 10 (disambiguation)
 System X (disambiguation)
 X Window System core protocol version 10 (X10), the predecessor to the popular and current X11 X/Windows
 OS (disambiguation)
 OS9 (disambiguation)
 O10 (disambiguation)
 S10 (disambiguation)
 OSX (disambiguation)